Events in the year 1963 in Germany.

Incumbents
President – Heinrich Lübke 
Chancellor
Konrad Adenauer (until 11 October 1963)
Ludwig Erhard (from 11 October 1963)

Events 
 January 22 - The Élysée Treaty was signed as a treaty of friendship between France and West Germany by President Charles de Gaulle and Chancellor Konrad Adenauer.
 February 17 - West Berlin state election, 1963
 February 28 - Germany in the Eurovision Song Contest 1963
 March 31 - Rhineland-Palatinate state election, 1963
 April 1  German broadcaster ZDF started.
 June 21 - July 2 - 13th Berlin International Film Festival
 June 26 - Ich bin ein Berliner is a quotation from a June 26, 1963, speech by U.S. President John F. Kennedy in West Berlin. 
 October 17 - The First Erhard cabinet led by Ludwig Erhard was sworn in.
 October 20 - East German general election, 1963
 November 7 - Wunder von Lengede
 Date unknown - Berliner Philharmonie is completed.

Births 
January 4
Till Lindemann, German singer 
Martina Proeber, German Olympic diver
January 11
Petra Schneider, German swimmer
Roland Wohlfarth, German football player
January 15 - Mathias Döpfner, German manager
January 17 - Kai Hansen, German power metal guitarist and singer
January 18 - Phillip Boa, German singer and musician
January 21 - Detlef Schrempf, German basketball player  
February 14 - Annette Kurschus, German präses of the Evangelical Church of Westphalia.
February 15 - Guildo Horn, German singer
February 20 - Oliver Mark, German photographer
February 23 - Andrea Sawatzki, German actress
March 2 - Monica Theodorescu, German equestrian
March 5 - Thomas Hermanns, German TV-presenter, director, TV-author and comedian
March 20 - Stephan Ackermann, German bishop of Roman Catholic Church
April 4 - Brigitte Voit, German chemist
April 11 - Jörg Woithe, German swimmer
June 1 - Angelika Nussberger, German judge
June 3 - Axel Wegner, German sport shooter
June 29 - Anne-Sophie Mutter, German violinist
July 2 - Jens Riewa, German journalist
July 4 - Ute Lemper, German singer
July 16 - Walter Kohl, German businessman and author
July 24 - Lars Nieberg, German equestrian
August 9 - Petra Pau, German politician
August 18 - Heino Ferch, German actor
August 26 - Ludger Beerbaum, German equestrian
September 2 – Thor Kunkel, German novelist
September 9 - Markus Wasmeier, German alpine ski racer
September 16 - Nikolaus Blome, German journalist
September 27 - Caren Metschuck, German swimmer
October 9 - Anja Jaenicke, German actress
October 13 - Thomas Dörflein, German zookeeper (died 2008)
October 27
Farin Urlaub, German singer
Lou, German singer
November 1 - Katja Riemann, German actress
November 10 - Cordula Stratmann, German comedian
November 16 - Frank Henkel, German politician
November 23 - Andreas Schmidt, German actor (died 2017) 
December 16 - Bärbel Schäfer, German television presenter
December 17 - Wolfram Grandezka, German actor
December 18 - Nino de Angelo, German singer
December 19 - Til Schweiger, German actor
December 21 - Andreas Voßkuhle, German judge
December 29 - Graciano Rocchigiani, German boxer (died 2018)

Deaths
January 19 — Ernst Torgler, German communist and politician (born 1893)
March 22 - Cilly Aussem, German tennis player (born 1909), died in Italy
March 27 - Harry Piel, German actor and filmdirector (born 1892)
April 6 - Karl Scharnagl, German politician (born 1881)
June 16 - Otto Ostrowski, German politician (born 1883)
July 2 - Bodo Uhse, German writer (born 1904)
August 7 — Paul Helwig, German psychologist (born 1893)
September 17 - Eduard Spranger, German (born 1882)
October 7 - Gustaf Gründgens, German actor (born 1899)
October 27 - Berthold, Margrave of Baden, German nobleman (born 1906)
December 5 - Karl Amadeus Hartmann, German composer (born 1905)
December 12 - Theodor Heuss, German politician and former President of Germany (born 1884)
December 14  Erich Ollenhauer, German politician (born 1901)
December 21 - Paul Westheim, German art historian and publisher (born 1886)
December 28 - Paul Hindemith, German composer, violist, violinist, teacher and conductor (born 1895)

See also
1963 in German television

References

 
Years of the 20th century in Germany
1960s in Germany
Germany
Germany